Ross McFarlane (born 6 December 1961) is a Scottish former professional footballer who played as a right back.

Career
Born in Glasgow, McFarlane began his career at Eastercraigs, before making 502 appearances in the Scottish Football League with both Queen's Park and Clyde.

He later became a part-time referee at the Massive Club Little Gaddesden Football Club where his son (Cameron Magson) plays Centre Back.

See also
 List of footballers in Scotland by number of league appearances (500+)

References

Living people
1961 births
Scottish footballers
Queen's Park F.C. players
Clyde F.C. players
Scottish Football League players
Association football fullbacks